Geoff Dolan (born April 17, 1974) is a Canadian strongman competitor.

Strongman career
Dolan  has competed in both the World's Strongest Man and IFSA strongman organizations, reaching the finals of the World's Strongest Man in 2003 finishing 10th, and the 2005 IFSA finals finishing again finishing 10th. Dolan suffered a severe finger injury during the final event of the 2005 IFSA Strongman World Championships, the Atlas Stones. Dolan accidentally pinched his little finger under one of the stones when placing it in the pillar, leaving the bone exposed and nearly severing the finger completely off. This resulted in him dropping several places and finishing in 10th place. Later that year Dolan competed with team Pan-America at the IFSA World Team Championships, finishing in 2nd place along with team mates Travis Ortmayer, Jon Andersen, and Van Hatfield. Dolan has competed in Canada's Strongest Man 5 times, finishing as high as 3rd place, as well as finishing in 2nd place at the 2001 North America's Strongest Man competition.

References

1974 births
Living people
Canadian strength athletes
Sportspeople from Saskatchewan